Alyaksey Belavusaw (born 26 April 1976) is a retired Belarusian professional footballer. His latest club was Torpedo Minsk.

Honours
Naftan Novopolotsk
Belarusian Cup winner: 2008–09

References

External links

1976 births
Living people
Belarusian footballers
FC Dinamo Minsk players
FC Shakhtyor Soligorsk players
FC Naftan Novopolotsk players
FC Belshina Bobruisk players
FC Vitebsk players
FC SKVICH Minsk players
FC Dinamo-Juni Minsk players
FC Torpedo Minsk players
Association football defenders